Hobo Branch is a stream in Crawford County in the U.S. state of Missouri. It is a tributary of Blue Springs Creek within the Blue Springs Creek Conservation Area.

Hobo Branch took its name from a nearby mine, the Hobo Sulphur and Iron Mines, where it was claimed hoboes worked.

References

Rivers of Crawford County, Missouri
Rivers of Missouri